This is a list of episodes of the television series The Monkees, which aired on NBC on Monday nights at 7:30 p.m. Eastern from 1966 to 1968.

The first songs listed are from the original NBC broadcasts. Over the summer of 1967, NBC reran multiple episodes with revised soundtracks to promote the Monkees' current album Headquarters and the singles released during that summer. Between 1969 and 1973, CBS (and later ABC) reran the episodes on Saturday morning, revising the soundtracks once again to promote the albums The Monkees Present and Changes. All alternate songs are listed where applicable.

Tracks with different mixes or versions as compared to the album versions are indicated.

Series overview

Episodes

Season 1 (1966–1967)
Debuting on September 12, 1966, the series aired on Monday nights at 7:30 p.m. Eastern, preceding I Dream of Jeannie and opposite The Iron Horse (ABC) and Gilligan's Island (CBS). A few episodes were aired in different chronological order than when they were filmed, such as episode 8, "Don't Look a Gift Horse in the Mouth" and the pilot as episode 10. 

Some syndicated and overseas versions of episode (such as many of those used by the BBC in the United Kingdom when it ran the series several times) use the second-season version of the opening credits in place of the original first-season version.

Season 2 (1967–1968)
The series aired on Monday nights preceding The Man from U.N.C.L.E., Rowan and Martin's Laugh-In, and The Champions and opposite Cowboy in Africa (ABC) and Gunsmoke (CBS). "For Pete's Sake" from the Headquarters album replaced the "Monkees Theme" as the closing song during this season.

Unproduced episode
 "Monkees Toy Around" (written by Coslough Johnson; first draft: February 27, 1967)

Movie
The Monkees also filmed a movie called Head that started production in early 1968, and was released in theaters that November by the Monkees' parent studio, Columbia, just after their TV show was canceled. Head was co-written by a then-largely-unknown Jack Nicholson. The film included six new songs, but was poorly promoted and not received very well by the public (as the film had a somewhat darker and more mature tone than the TV series) or contemporary critics; in the decades since, it has become a cult hit; some of the film's songs joined the Monkees' concert setlist.

Later television episodes
The Monkees' television series was canceled after its second season. The group hoped to take the television show in different directions, e.g. recasting it as an hour-long variety show with comedy sketches and musical guests. However, NBC wanted the show to stay the same. Both parties decided to throw in the towel. After the series was canceled, NBC contracted with The Monkees to create and broadcast three longer television specials.

33⅓ Revolutions Per Monkee was the first of these longer television productions. It aired on NBC on April 14, 1969 (opposite ABC's live telecast of the 41st Academy Awards) to lower-than-expected ratings. The second two planned television specials were never produced. Peter Tork quit the group between the taping of 33⅓ Revolutions Per Monkee and its broadcast; Michael Nesmith left the group - buying out of his contract - in early 1970 to focus on his solo career, leaving the Monkees as a duo of Dolenz and Jones, under which one final original Monkees album under the 1966 Colgems contract, Changes, was released in June 1970.

The Monkees returned to broadcast television with Hey, Hey, It's the Monkees, a reunion special which was broadcast on ABC on February 17, 1997. The special was written and directed by Nesmith, emulating the style of the original NBC series; all four of the "real" Monkees do comedy and sing songs, some of which were new songs from the quartet's 1996 album Justus. This would be the last time Dolenz, Jones, Nesmith, and Tork would appear together on a television special, although Dolenz, Jones, and Tork made semi-frequent guest appearances on TV talk shows (such as The Tonight Show with Jay Leno, the Rosie O'Donnell Show and the Today show) for a few years afterwards. Davy Jones died in 2012.

Nesmith, Dolenz and Tork continued to make occasional TV interview appearances in later years. The trio appeared together for a May 2016 interview with Anthony Mason of CBS News Sunday Morning, on the occasion of the group's 50th anniversary. Peter Tork died in 2019. Michael Nesmith died in 2021.

Notes
 Episodes frequently finished short of the allotted thirty minutes; this led producer Rafelson to film candid backstage interviews with the boys that lasted one minute, and led to a frequent quip, "We're a minute short."  For the episode "Find the Monkees", the epilogue interview (in which the Monkees discussed the then-recent Sunset Strip riots) lasted three minutes.
 During the series' original NBC run and during CBS Saturday-morning repeats, some episodes were updated with music from the band's current releases. The Monkees ceased releasing new records in 1970, but altered episodes continued on CBS until 1972.
 Many of the episodes, particularly those of the second season, are known by more than one title. This is largely due to the episodes not having their titles shown on screen; and rerun episodes sometimes billed with different titles from that given on the original showings. Occasionally, the early draft titles were confused with the final title; and slogans from promotional advertisements (such as those in TV Guide) may also be confused with the actual episode title.
 The use of a laugh track was officially dropped starting with the second-season episode "Hitting the High Seas", with the exception of "The Monkees Watch Their Feet" and "The Devil and Peter Tork", as they were produced before the practice went into effect.
 A majority of Season 2 episodes were leftover scripts from Season 1 and shot in the spring of 1967, shortly after the first season finished shooting. The rest of the season was shot in the fall of 1967, but episodes were not aired in the order in which they were filmed. This explains the difference in appearances for each of the Monkees, as well as the alteration in Mike Nesmith's voice (a result of throat surgery). An example of this: "The Monkees Blow Their Minds" as compared to "The Wild Monkees." The differences show up in "The Monkees in Paris" between the teaser and epilogue (featuring Micky with his hair curled up) and the bulk of the episode (where Micky's hair is combed). This is also evident between the storyline filming and the music portions of some episodes. In "It's a Nice Place to Visit", Micky's hair is combed back throughout the episode. However, when they play "What Am I Doing Hanging 'Round?", Micky's hair is curly. Plus, Mike spoke with a slightly husky, stronger voice in episodes such as "The Monkee's Paw" and "The Monkees in Paris," whereas he kept his pre-surgery voice in such episodes as "The Devil and Peter Tork" and "Art for Monkee's Sake." 
 When the TV series was distributed and broadcast in syndication beginning in 1975, the opening credits sequence used for all 58 episodes was the sequence from the original Season 2. This package was also commonly shown in the United Kingdom and seen on MTV in the 1980s. Many modern viewers of the program never saw the Season 1 opening credits sequence, which is included in most newer DVD compilations, until the show began airing on MeTV in a remastered widescreen version in 2019.

References

The Monkees: The Day-by-Day Story of the 60s TV Pop Sensation by Andrew Sandoval - Lists which songs get replaced in the 1967 reruns and the Saturday morning reruns from September 1969 to December 1970.

The Monkees Film and TV Vault - A website providing much extensively researched information on the band and the TV show, including song substitutions from 1967 and from 1969 to 1972.

Episodes
Lists of American sitcom episodes
Lists of American children's television series episodes